Dr. Stanley G. Cohen is the former President of Five Towns College located in Dix Hills, NY on Long Island.  He has served as President since the college was chartered in 1972.  He founded the Dix Hills Performing Arts Center which is located at the college.

Cohen has his Doctorate in Education (Ed.D.) and his Bachelor of Science (B.S.) from New York University in Music Education. He obtained his Master of Arts (M.A.) degree from Queens College.

Cohen has taught music at the James Madison, Francis Lewis, and John Bowne High Schools in Queens, he was instrumental in establishing music programs at the latter two schools. He also served as an Associate Professor of Music at Kingsborough Community College of the City University of New York, an Assistant Examiner for the NYC Board of Examiners for prospective music teachers, and the Director of the Lincoln Center Performances for the NYC School Study and Concert Group.

Cohen is saxophonist, clarinettist, and flutist as well as playing trumpet and piano.  He was married to the late Mrs. Lorraine Kleinman-Cohen; they have three children, Martin, David, and Janet.

Cohens future actions towards Five Towns College include: Fixing the Parking lot, Getting healthier food in the cafeteria and developing more appropriate schedules suiting the students needs. Also, he hopes to get larger desks as most students do not fit in the ones currently provided.

Cohen is a trustee of the Long Island Regional Advisory Council on Higher Education (LIRACHE), a member of the National Association of Jazz Educators (NAJE), a member of the National Association of Schools of Music (NASM), a member of the American Federation of Musicians, and a member of numerous other organizations.

References

External links
  Profile on Five Towns College Website
  2008 Honoree for The Theatre Museum Award

Living people
American music educators
Year of birth missing (living people)